Sarah Boone (née Sarah Marshall; 1832 – 1904) was an African-American inventor. On April 26, 1892, she obtained United States patent number 473,563 for her improvements to the ironing board.  Boone's ironing board was designed to improve the quality of ironing the sleeves and bodies of women's garments. The ironing board was very narrow, curved, and made of wood. The shape and structure allowed it to fit a sleeve and it was reversible, so one could iron both sides of the sleeve. 

Boone is regarded as the second African-American woman to attain a patent, after Judy Reed.  Along with Miriam Benjamin, Ellen Eglin, and Sarah Goode, Boone was a pioneering African-American woman inventor who developed new technology for the home.

Personal life

Sarah Marshall was born in Craven County, North Carolina, near the town of New Bern, in 1832.  Along with her three siblings, she was born into slavery and barred from formal education. Sarah was educated by her grandfather at home. On November 25, 1847, she married James Boone (or Boon)—a free black man—in New Bern and was granted freedom from slavery. They had eight children.

The Boone family left North Carolina for New Haven, Connecticut, before the outbreak of the American Civil War. They settled into a house at 30 Winter Street. Boone worked as a dressmaker  and belonged to the Dixwell Avenue Congregational Church.

Death 
Boone died in 1904, and is buried in a family plot in Evergreen Cemetery in New Haven.

See also

 Judy W. Reed
 List of African-American inventors and scientists
 Timeline of United States inventions

References

External links

1904 deaths
19th-century American businesswomen
19th-century American businesspeople
African-American inventors
Women inventors
19th-century American inventors
1832 births
People from Craven County, North Carolina
19th-century American slaves
American tailors
20th-century African-American people
20th-century African-American women
19th-century African-American women